Michael Erard (born 27 December 1967) is an American non-fiction writer and journalist. He holds an M.A. (linguistics) and a Ph.D. (English) from the University of Texas at Austin.

Notable works

Books
Erard, Michael (2007). Um…: Slips, Stumbles, and Verbal Blunders, and What They Mean. New York: Pantheon.
Erard, Michael (2012). Babel No More: The Search for the World's Most Extraordinary Language Learners. New York: Free Press.

Articles
Erard, Michael (2005). 'The Gift of the Gab'. New Scientist, 8 January, .‍
Erard, Michael (2012). 'King of the Hyperpolyglots'. The Morning News, 10 January.
Erard, Michael (2012). 'The Polyglot of Bologna'. The Public Domain Review, 26 June.
Erard, Michael (2016). 'Why Australia is Home to One of the Largest Language Families in the World'. Science, 21 September.
Erard, Michael (2019). 'Pete Buttigieg’s Language Magic Is Textbook Polyglot Mythmaking'. The Atlantic, 29 April.

Notes

References

External links

1967 births
American male journalists
American non-fiction writers
Living people
University of Texas at Austin College of Liberal Arts alumni
Place of birth missing (living people)